Anders Järryd and Hans Simonsson won the title by defeating Tim Gullikson and Bernard Mitton 6–4, 6–3 in the final.

Seeds

Draw

Draw

References

External links
 Official results archive (ATP)
 Official results archive (ITF)

Tennis tournaments in Italy
Ancona Open
1982 in Italian tennis